Josua Swanepoel (born 27 May 1983) is a South African cricketer. He played in one first-class match for Boland in 2007.

See also
 List of Boland representative cricketers

References

External links
 

1983 births
Living people
South African cricketers
Boland cricketers
Cricketers from Durban